DRD may refer to:
Data Retention Directive, a European Union directive on storing telephony communications
Decision Requirements Diagrams, a part of the Decision Model and Notation standard
 Defending Rights & Dissent
 Denver Roller Dolls, roller skating
Department of Rural Development, a division of the Ministry of Livestock, Fisheries and Rural Development in Myanmar
Department for Regional Development, a former executive department in Northern Ireland
Design Requirements Document, software engineering; similar to a User Requirements Document
Dividends received deduction, a financial term
Diagnostic Repair Drones, fictional robots from Farscape
Dopamine-responsive dystonia, a disease
Dynamic Root Disk, computing

Codes
Amtrak train station code for Durand Union Station
ICAO airline designator code for Air Madrid
former stock symbol for Duane Reade

People
Dario Faini, Italian songwriter and producer also known under the pseudonyms DRD o Dardust